Tea tree oil, also known as melaleuca oil, is an essential oil with a fresh camphoraceous odor and a colour that ranges from pale yellow to nearly colourless and clear. It is derived from the leaves of the tea tree, Melaleuca alternifolia, native to southeast Queensland and the northeast coast of New South Wales, Australia. The oil comprises many constituent chemicals and its composition changes if it is exposed to air and oxidizes.

Commercial use of tea tree oil began in the 1920s, pioneered by the entrepreneur Arthur Penfold.  the global tea tree oil market was valued at US$39 million.

As a traditional medicine, it is typically used as a topical medication in low concentrations for the treatment of skin conditions, but there is little evidence of efficacy. Tea tree oil is claimed as useful for treating dandruff, acne, lice, herpes, insect bites, scabies, and skin fungal or bacterial infections. However, there is not enough evidence to support any of these claims due to the limited amount of research conducted on the topic. Tea tree oil is neither a patented product nor an approved drug in the United States, although it is approved as a complementary medicine for aromatherapy in Australia. It is poisonous if consumed by mouth, and unsafe to use on children.

Uses
Tea tree oil has been used as a traditional herbal medicine in the belief it treats acne, nail fungus, or athlete's foot, with little evidence to support these uses. A 2015 Cochrane systematic review for acne complementary therapies, found a low-quality single trial showed benefit compared to placebo.

According to the Committee on Herbal Medicinal Products (CHMP) of the European Medicines Agency, traditional usage suggests that tea tree oil is a plausible treatment for "small superficial wounds, insect bites and small boils", that it may help reduce itching in minor cases of athlete's foot, and help with mild inflammation of the mouth lining. The CHMP say tea tree oil products should not be used on people under 12 years of age.

Tea tree oil is not recommended for treating nail fungus as it is not effective. It is not recommended for treating head lice in children because its effectiveness and safety has not been established and it could cause skin irritation or allergic reactions. There is no good evidence tea tree oil is an effective treatment for demodex mite infestations.

Toxicity 
Tea tree oil is highly toxic when ingested. It may cause drowsiness, confusion, hallucinations, coma, unsteadiness, weakness, vomiting, diarrhea, nausea, blood cell abnormalities, and severe rashes. It should be kept away from pets and children. Tea tree oil should not be used in or around the mouth.

Application of tea tree oil to the skin can cause an allergic reaction. The potential for causing an allergic reaction increases as the oil ages and its chemical composition changes. Adverse effects include skin irritation, allergic contact dermatitis, systemic contact dermatitis, linear immunoglobulin A disease, erythema multiforme-like reactions, and systemic hypersensitivity reactions. Allergic reactions may be due to the various oxidation products that are formed by exposure of the oil to light and air. Consequently, oxidized tea tree oil should not be used.

In Australia, tea tree oil is one of the many essential oils causing poisoning, mostly of children. In the period 2014-2018, there were 749 reported cases in New South Wales, accounting for 17% of essential oil poisoning incidents.

Hormonal effects 
Tea tree oil potentially poses a risk for causing abnormal breast enlargement in men, and pre-pubertal children. A 2018 study by the National Institute of Environmental Health Sciences found four of the constituent chemicals (eucalyptol, 4-terpineol, dipentene and alpha-terpineol) are endocrine disruptors, raising concerns of potential environmental health impact from the oil.

In animals
In dogs and cats, death or transient signs of toxicity (lasting two to three days), such as lethargy, weakness, incoordination and muscle tremors, have been reported after external application at high doses.

As a test of toxicity by oral intake, the median lethal dose (LD50) in rats is 1.9–2.4 ml/kg.

Composition and characteristics

Tea tree oil is defined by the International Standard ISO 4730 ("Oil of Melaleuca, terpinen-4-ol type"), containing terpinen-4-ol, γ-terpinene, and α-terpinene as about 70% to 90% of whole oil, while p-cymene, terpinolene, α-terpineol, and α-pinene collectively account for some 15% of the oil (table, right). The oil has been described as colorless to pale yellow having a fresh, camphor-like smell.

Tea tree oil products contain various phytochemicals among which terpinen-4-ol is the major component. Adverse reactions diminish with lower eucalyptol content.

History and extraction 
The name tea tree is used for several plants, mostly from Australia and New Zealand, from the family Myrtaceae, related to the myrtle. The use of the name probably originated from Captain James Cook's description of one of these shrubs that he used to make an infusion to drink in place of tea.

The commercial tea tree oil industry originated in the 1920s when Australian chemist Arthur Penfold investigated the business potential of a number of native extracted oils; he reported that tea tree oil had promise, as it exhibited antiseptic properties.

Tea tree oil was first extracted from Melaleuca alternifolia in Australia, and this species remains the most important commercially. In the 1970s and 1980s, commercial plantations began to produce large quantities of tea tree oil from M. alternifolia. Many of these plantations are located in New South Wales. Since the 1970s and 80s, the industry has expanded to include several other species for their extracted oil: Melaleuca armillaris and Melaleuca styphelioides in Tunisia and Egypt; Melaleuca leucadendra in Egypt, Malaysia and Vietnam; Melaleuca acuminata in Tunisia; Melaleuca ericifolia in Egypt; and Melaleuca quinquenervia in the United States.  Similar oils can also be produced by water distillation from Melaleuca linariifolia and Melaleuca dissitiflora. Whereas the availability and nonproprietary nature of tea tree oil would make it – if proved effective – particularly well-suited to a disease like scabies that affects poor people disproportionately, those same characteristics diminish corporate interest in its development and validation.

According to Allied Market Research, "the global tea tree oil market size was valued at $38.8 million in 2017 and is projected to reach $59.5 million by 2025".

See also 
 Cajeput oil — derived from Melaleuca cajuputi

References 

Essential oils
Antiseptics
Antifungals
Skin care
Acne treatments
Dermatologic drugs
Traditional medicine
Non-timber forest products
Endocrine disruptors